Nubia Technology is a Chinese smartphone manufacturer headquartered in Shenzhen, Guangdong. Originally established as a wholly owned subsidiary of ZTE in 2012, it became an independent company in 2015 and received a significant investment from Suning Holdings Group and Suning Commerce Group in 2016. ZTE reduced its stake in Nubia to 49.9% in 2017 officially meaning Nubia was no longer considered a subsidiary of ZTE, but more of an associate company.

In February 2016 Nubia became a sponsor of Jiangsu Suning F.C. for a reported .

The company hired footballer Cristiano Ronaldo to promote the mobile phone of the company in May 2016.

In 2017, China Daily reported that Nubia would build a factory in Nanchang, Jiangxi Province.

In April 2018, Nubia Technology launched a gaming sub-brand, named REDMAGIC (红魔). REDMAGIC recently announced its new 5G compatible device REDMAGIC 5G on March 12, 2020, in Shanghai. REDMAGIC is known for being the first smartphone brand to put cooling fans inside their phones. The company also unveiled a partnership with Chinese esport team Royal Never Give Up, to further expand its brand among esport enthusiasts.

On April 13, 2020, Nubia Technology unveiled a brand new logo as well as its new brand vision.

In March 2022, Nubia Technology unveiled the first gaming phone featuring an under-display camera technology, the REDMAGIC 7 Pro.

Products

Smartphone

RedMagic sub-brand

Nubia

References

External links
 

Manufacturing companies based in Shenzhen
Mobile phone companies of China
Mobile phone manufacturers
Electronics companies of China
Chinese brands
Flexible displays